Antoine Ashley (December 17, 1984 – October 1, 2012), better known by the name Sahara Davenport, was an American drag queen, singer, reality television personality, and classically trained dancer. Davenport was best known as a contestant on the second season of RuPaul's Drag Race.

RuPaul's Drag Race

Davenport appeared on the second season of RuPaul's Drag Race in 2010. She was pegged as "the dancer" when in the first episode she had to "lip-sync for her life" against Shangela, her former classmate at Southern Methodist University (where she earned a BFA in dance at the Meadows School of the Arts). In the second episode, Davenport became a team leader when she and Pandora Boxx won the mini challenge. Sahara won the second episode elimination challenge by leading her team to earn the most money by pole dancing and selling Cherry Pie gift certificates on the streets of Los Angeles. In the fourth episode, Davenport gave a humorous impersonation of Whitney Houston in the "Snatch Game" challenge. In the Wedding Dress episode, she was placed in the bottom two again, but remained safe with her lip sync performance to Martha Wash's "Carry On". Sahara was eliminated in the sixth episode for not conveying enough of a "rock 'n' roll" attitude and being too much of a lady. The first season of RuPaul's Drag Race All Stars aired following her death, and featured her partner, Manila Luzon, as a contestant. The first episode was dedicated to her memory.

Davenport's drag sister Kennedy Davenport appeared on season 7 of RuPaul's Drag Race and on season 3 of RuPaul's Drag Race All Stars, where she placed as runner-up. Her drag niece, Honey Davenport, placed 13th on the 11th season of Drag Race.

Music
In 2011, Davenport released her second single "Go Off". A remix EP was later released on January 31, 2012, and featured a remix by Manny Lehman.  "Go Off" debuted at number fifty on the Billboard Hot Dance Club Songs,  before peaking at number thirty five. The music video for "Go Off" features cameos by Drag Race contestants Manila Luzon and Jiggly Caliente.

Personal life and death 

Davenport was born to Angela Ashley Reddish on December 17, 1984. Sahara Davenport resided in New York City with her boyfriend Karl Westerberg, a fellow drag queen who goes by the stage name Manila Luzon and who was a contestant on the third season of RuPaul's Drag Race. During her time on RuPaul's Drag Race, Davenport discussed her use of "designer drugs", such as ketamine, and how her drag mother had to help her out of her addiction. Davenport died of heart failure at Johns Hopkins Hospital in Baltimore on October 1, 2012 at age 27.

Discography

Singles

See also
 LGBT culture in New York City
 List of LGBT people from New York City

References

External links

Sahara Davenport on Logo

1984 births
2012 deaths
African-American dancers
African-American drag queens
African-American male dancers
American drag queens
American male dancers
American male pop singers
American gay actors
American gay musicians
LGBT African Americans
LGBT people from Texas
American LGBT singers
Male actors from Dallas
Musicians from Dallas
Nightlife in New York City
Sahara Davenport
20th-century LGBT people
21st-century American LGBT people
African-American male singers